Božena Viková-Kunětická (30 July 1862 – 18 March 1934) was a Czech nationalist politician, writer, and feminist. Born in Pardubice, in the Kingdom of Bohemia (part of the present-day Czech Republic) she was the first female member of the Bohemian diet. She spent her last 12 years in Libočany where she died in 1934. A novelist,  her work is stored at the Literary Archive of the Museum of Czech Literature.

Selected works

Short stories

 Povídky (1887)
 Drobné povídky (1888)
 Čtyři povídky (1890)
 Po svatbě (1892)
 Nové povídky (1892)
 Vdova po chirurgovi (1893)
 Idylky (1894)
 Silhouetty mužů (1899)
 Staří mládenci a jiné povídky (1901)
 Macecha a jiné črty (1902)

Novels and short stories

 Justyna Holdanová (1892)
 Minulost (1895)
 Medřická (1897)
 Vzpoura (1901)
 Pán (1905)

See also
List of the first female holders of political offices in Europe

References

External links


1862 births
1934 deaths
Writers from Pardubice
People from the Kingdom of Bohemia
Young Czech Party politicians
Czechoslovak National Democracy politicians
Members of the Bohemian Diet
Members of the Revolutionary National Assembly of Czechoslovakia
Members of the Senate of Czechoslovakia (1920–1925)
Czech women writers
Czech feminists
20th-century Czech women politicians
Politicians from Pardubice